Para Hills Knights SC is a soccer club based in Para Hills West, South Australia, a suburb in the north of Adelaide. Founded in 1964, the club has multiple State League championships, and have been runner-up in both the Premier League and Federation Cup, The club currently competes in the State League 1 South Australia.

History
The Para Hills Community Soccer Club was formed by Robert Eldridge, John Eldridge, Chick Harris, John West, Andy Balter and Malcolm Owen on March 24 1964. The aim of the club being to foster and promote the game of soccer in the Northern Suburbs. The Eldridge brothers were Tottenham Hotspur supporters, so their kit early on was full white. The club set the goal of playing first division soccer within 10 years. In 1965 the club entered a team in the Sunday Industrial League. On April 4 1965 the club played its first competitive senior game losing 3–1 with Chris Pawley scoring the first goal for the club.

The following year the club entered the South Australian Soccer Federation and once again the first game resulted in a defeat, 2-1 with the first goal in the Federation being scored by Dave Barry. In 1967 the club won its first silverware, being the 3rd Division Championship, and the Rowely Cup.

In 1976, one year later than the club originally aimed for, Para Hills won promotion to South Australia's first division. Before the start of the 1977 season, the club left its base at Nelson Road to move to new facilities at The Paddocks. The club's first game in the first division was a 4-3 victory against Campbelltown Budapest on the new pitch, the winning goal scored by Harry McDonald. By the third week, the club had achieved its only two wins of the league season, narrowly avoiding relegation.

In Para Hill's fourth year in the top division, they finished one point behind Premiers Adelaide Croatia Raiders, missing out on top spot after a 1–1 draw with them in the final round. A month later, they won the Coca Cola Challenge Cup after a 3–0 win over Adelaide Croatia Raiders, which was their first major silverware in the club's 17 year history.

Players

Current squad

Notable former players

Honours

Domestic
 South Australian Division One Championship
Runner-Up (1): 1980
 South Australian Division One Premiership
Runner-Up (1): 2010
 South Australian Division Two Championship
Winners (4): 1976, 1990, 2006, 2012
Runner-Up (6): 1975, 1995, 1998, 2001, 2016, 2022
 South Australian Division Two Premiership
Winners (1): 1995
Runner-Up (3): 2001, 2004, 2016
 South Australian Division Three Championship
Winners (1): 1967

Knockout
 Federation Cup
Runner-Up (4): 1982, 1986, 1989, 2012
 First Division Top Four Cup
Winners (1): 1980
Runner-Up (1): 1984
 Second Division Cup
Winners (1): 1976
 Third Division Cup
Winners (1): 1967
 Summer Night Series
Winners (1): 2007

Divisional history

References

National Premier Leagues clubs
Soccer clubs in South Australia
Association football clubs established in 1964
1964 establishments in Australia